Union is a hamlet in Madison County, New York, United States. Delphi Falls is located southwest of Union.

References

Hamlets in Madison County, New York
Hamlets in New York (state)